Ronald Marshall "Ron" Merriott (born May 24, 1960) is an American former diver who competed in the 1984 Summer Olympics. He was born in Rockford, Illinois. In 1984, Merriott won the NCAA championship in 3-meter springboard diving. His score of 600.3 is the highest of any of the University of Michigan's national champion 3-meter divers.

References

1960 births
Living people
Divers at the 1984 Summer Olympics
Olympic bronze medalists for the United States in diving
American male divers
Medalists at the 1984 Summer Olympics